Humboldt is a city in Gibson and Madison counties, Tennessee. The population was 8,452 at the 2010 census, a decline of 1,015 from 2000. It is the principal city of and is included in the Humboldt, Tennessee Micropolitan Statistical Area, which is included in the Jackson, Tennessee-Humboldt, Tennessee Combined Statistical Area.

History
The first settlers of what would become Humboldt, began moving into the area in the mid 1850s. The town was a Railroad town. Its history begins with the Crossing of the Mobile & Ohio and the Memphis & Ohio (later L&N) Railroads. This was completed in 1859. The town wasn't chartered until after the Civil War in 1866. (Source: www.humboldthistorical.com)

The city is named for German naturalist Alexander von Humboldt.

Geography
Humboldt is located at  (35.822564, −88.911138). Most of the city lies in Gibson County, with only a small portion extending into Madison County. In the 2000 census, 9,442 of the city's 9,467 residents (99.7%) lived in Gibson County and 25 (0.3%) in Madison County.

According to the United States Census Bureau, the city has a total area of 9.7 square miles (25.0 km2), of which 9.7 square miles (25.0 km2) is land and 0.10% is water.

Demographics

2020 census

As of the 2020 United States census, there were 7,874 people, 3,561 households, and 2,052 families residing in the city.

2000 census
As of the census of 2000, there were 9,467 people, 3,864 households, and 2,538 families residing in the city. The population density was 980.0 people per square mile (378.4/km2). There were 4,243 housing units at an average density of 439.2 per square mile (169.6/km2). The racial makeup of the city was 55.06% White, 43.00% African American, 0.25% Native American, 0.06% Asian, 1.00% from other races, and 0.61% from two or more races. Hispanic or Latino of any race were 1.56% of the population.

There were 3,864 households, out of which 28.5% had children under the age of 18 living with them, 41.4% were married couples living together, 20.0% had a female householder with no husband present, and 34.3% were non-families. 30.8% of all households were made up of individuals, and 14.8% had someone living alone who was 65 years of age or older. The average household size was 2.36 and the average family size was 2.93.

In the city, the population was spread out, with 24.0% under the age of 18, 8.8% from 18 to 24, 24.7% from 25 to 44, 22.1% from 45 to 64, and 20.4% who were 65 years of age or older. The median age was 39 years. For every 100 females, there were 86.4 males. For every 100 females age 18 and over, there were 80.0 males.

The median income for a household in the city was $26,351, and the median income for a family was $32,845. Males had a median income of $30,848 versus $20,890 for females. The per capita income for the city was $14,433. About 16.1% of families and 18.1% of the population were below the poverty line, including 24.8% of those under age 18 and 16.9% of those age 65 or over.

Climate
The climate in this area is characterized by relatively high temperatures and evenly distributed precipitation throughout the year.  According to the Köppen Climate Classification system, Humboldt has a Humid subtropical climate, abbreviated "Cfa" on climate maps.

Transportation

Road
U.S. Route 79 and U.S. Route 45W intersect in Humboldt.

Air
The city-owned Humboldt Municipal Airport is located in Gibson County.

Rail

Media

Cable
Cable TV is supplied through a locally owned business named 1Tennessee.net (formerly click1).

Newspaper
The local newspaper is called the Humboldt Chronicle.

Television

W45CK Channel 45 is a Unity Broadcasting Network station. (Currently silent)

Radio
 WTJK 105.3 "La Poderosa 105.3 FM".
 WJPJ AM 1190 & 99.9 "WJPJ Fox Sports Jackson 1190AM/99.9FM" 
 WIRJ AM 740
 WZDQ FM 102.3 "102.3 The Rocket"

Special events
Since 1934, the city has hosted the West Tennessee Strawberry Festival, held the first full week of May.

Notable people

 Rayburn Anthony - Rockabilly, country and gospel musician
 Doug Atkins – NFL Hall of Fame football player
 Chick Autry – Baseball player
 Ben E. Clement - World War I Aviator, Fluorspar Miner, Artist, Entrepreneur, Museum in Marion, KY
 Tony Champion - CFL All Star football player
 Fred Craddock – Professor of preaching
 Jesse Hill Ford – Writer and playwright
 Lew Jetton – Musician, television personality
 Valerie June – Singer/songwriter
 Frank O Pinion - Radio personality
 Wyatt Prunty  – Poet
 Kacy Rodgers – NFL assistant football coach
 T.G. Sheppard – Singer/Songwriter
 Trey Smith (offensive lineman) - NFL offensive lineman, Super Bowl LVII champion
Dale Sommers – Radio personality
Bailey Walsh - Politician
 Murray Warmath – College football coach
 Samuel Cole Williams – Historian

References

Cities in Tennessee
Cities in Gibson County, Tennessee
Jackson metropolitan area, Tennessee
Cities in Madison County, Tennessee
Majority-minority cities and towns in Tennessee